Wasior is a village  in Wasior District of Teluk Wondama Regency,  in the Indonesian province of West Papua, at the western end of New Guinea.

Wasior, divided into two kelurahan for administrative purposes, is the largest village in Teluk Wondama Regency.  In this village there are shops, churches, a seaport and an airport.

References 

Populated places in West Papua